Duncanville is a city in southwest Dallas County, Texas, in the United States. Duncanville's population was 40,706 at the 2020 census. The city is part of the Best Southwest area, which includes Duncanville, Cedar Hill, DeSoto, and Lancaster.

History
Settlement of the area began in 1845, when Illinois resident Crawford Trees purchased several thousand acres south of Camp Dallas. In 1880, the Chicago, Texas, and Mexican Central Railway reached the area and built Duncan Switch, named for a line foreman. Charles P. Nance, the community's first postmaster, renamed the settlement Duncanville in 1882. By the late 19th century, Duncanville was home to a dry-goods stores, a pharmacy, a domino parlor, and a school. Between 1904 and 1933, the population of Duncanville increased from 113 to more than 300.

During World War II, the Army Air Corps established a landing field for flight training on property near the present-day intersection of Main St and Wheatland Road.

Duncanville residents incorporated the city on August 2, 1947. During the postwar years, the military developed the Army's old landing field into the Duncanville Air Force Station, which was the headquarters for the four Nike-Hercules missile launch sites guarding Dallas/Fort Worth from Soviet bomber attack. It also housed the Air Force tracking radars for the region.

When the town's population reached 5,000 in 1962, citizens adopted a home-rule charter with council-manager city government. Sometimes regarded as a "white flight" suburb in the 1960s and 1970s, the city is now known for its racial diversity. Its population increased from about 13,000 in 1970 to more than 31,000 in 1988.

Historic preservation
The Texas Historical Commission has designated the City of Duncanville as an official Main Street City.

Duncanville recognizes the importance of the former Duncanville Air Force Station, which closed on July 1, 1964, but the Army continued to operate the Nike Missile air defense operations until 1969, when the facility was turned over to the city. The WWII-era barracks and some other structures were initially repurposed for civic and community use. Over time, the buildings were systematically demolished, removing all signs of the historic base, but the history of the facility lives on in a monument that stands outside the library and community center.

The "stone igloo", a spring house originally located near the intersection of Center Street and Cedar Ridge Road, was preserved in a unique way. In the late 1960s or early 1970s, it was demolished, thereby producing a supply of rocks used to build a replica of the structure at a nearby park and paving the way for the construction of a neighborhood retail center.

Various pieces of the city's history are preserved at the Duncanville Historical Park, which is located on Wheatland Road in Armstrong Park on land that was once a part of the Duncanville Air Force Station. Historic buildings include the city's first Music Room.

Geography
Duncanville is located at  (32.646333, −96.911309).

Demographics

As of the 2020 United States census, there were 40,706 people, 13,573 households, and 10,000 families residing in the city.

Government
Duncanville City Hall is located at 203 E. Wheatland Road. Most city services are located in this facility, which also includes the Duncanville Recreation Center featuring meeting rooms, a double gymnasium, and an indoor walking track. Armstrong Park is also located next to City Hall. Duncanville has three walking trails, 17 city parks, and many other recreation spaces for team sports.

U.S. Route 67 runs through the eastern portion of Duncanville. Interstate 20 passes through its northern portion.

The United States Postal Service operates the Duncanville Post Office.

The Duncanville Public Library is located at 201 James Collins Boulevard.

The city of Duncanville is a voluntary member of the North Central Texas Council of Governments association, the purpose of which is to coordinate individual and collective local governments and facilitate regional solutions, eliminate unnecessary duplication, and enable joint decisions.

Politics

Education
Duncanville is served by the Duncanville Independent School District.

The Duncanville ISD portion is zoned to Duncanville High School, which enrolls about 3,750 students annually, with over 4,000 students during the 2010–2011 school year. In total, 13  of the 17 schools in the district are rated exemplary or recognized by the  Texas Education Agency, and the district's ratings continue to outperform those of the surrounding districts (Cedar Hill, DeSoto, Lancaster, Dallas, Grand Prairie). They also outperform many of the school districts throughout the Dallas–Fort Worth area.

Duncanville is also home to the administrative offices of Advantage Academy.

Dallas County residents are zoned to Dallas College (formerly Dallas County Community College or DCCCD).

Notable people
 Greg Abbott, Texas governor; a 1976 graduate of Duncanville High School
 Brigetta Barrett, high jumper, silver medalist in 2012 London Olympics and 2013 world championships, is a graduate of DHS
 Tamika Catchings, WNBA all-star, graduated from DHS in 1997, having played on the women's basketball team that won the state championship. She is the first person to achieve a quintuple double
 Barry Foster, former running back for Pittsburgh Steelers, attended high school at DHS
 Cyrus Gray, Kansas City Chiefs running back played his freshmen year of high-school football for Duncanville High School before he moved to DeSoto
 Joe Greene, Ex-professional football player "Mean Joe Greene" lived in Duncanville during the height of his career with the Pittsburgh Steelers
 Perry Jones, forward for the Oklahoma City Thunder, played basketball at Duncanville High School
 Greg Ostertag, is a 1991 graduate of Duncanville High School (DHS). He averaged 22.5 points and 13 rebounds per game during his senior season, and capped the year by leading the Panthers to the 1991 state championship, the first for the school's boys basketball team.  After his successful high school career, Ostertag joined the basketball team at the University of Kansas from 1991 to 1995 and professionally for the Utah Jazz from 1995 to 2004
 Dashaun Phillips, American football cornerback; was born in and lived in Duncanville, graduated from DHS in 2008, and played college football for the Tarleton State Texans. Phillips then went on to play professional football. In the NFL, he most notably played for the Washington Redskins, but was also a member of the Dallas Cowboys, New York Jets, and Pittsburgh Steelers team practice squads throughout his career. He most recently played in the XFL for the Dallas Renegades, having been selected in the 2020 XFL Draft by the Renegades as the 17th pick of the "position-based" defensive backs draft stage, phase 4
 Kenneth Lee Pike, Linguist and author; lived in Duncanville for many years, later moving to a nearby neighborhood in Dallas. While he lived in Duncanville, US Senator Alan J. Dixon and US Congressman Paul Simon announced that they had nominated Pike for the Nobel Peace Prize (though the Nobel Prize Committee does not officially announce nominations)
 Steven Romo (journalist), News anchor, reporter and writer grew up in Duncanville and attended Duncanville Independent School District schools
 Elliott Smith, Singer that moved to Duncanville after his parents divorced when he was six months old and stayed till age 14, when he went to live with his father in Portland, Oregon

References

External links

 City of Duncanville official website
 Duncanville Chamber of Commerce

Cities in the Dallas–Fort Worth metroplex
Cities in Texas
Cities in Dallas County, Texas
Populated places established in 1880
1880 establishments in Texas